Industrial & Engineering Chemistry Research  is a peer-reviewed scientific journal published by the American Chemical Society covering all aspects of chemical engineering. The editor-in-chief is Phillip E. Savage (Pennsylvania State University).

History 
The journal was established in 1909 as the Journal of Industrial & Engineering Chemistry. It was renamed in 1930 as Industrial & Engineering Chemistry before obtaining its current title in 1970. From 1911 to 1916 it was edited by Milton C. Whitaker. From 1921 to 1942 it was edited by Dr. Harrison E. Howe.

The journal I&EC Product Research and Development was established in 1962. It was renamed Product R&D in 1969 and renamed again in 1978 as Industrial & Engineering Chemistry Product Research and Development. In 1986, it and the journals Industrial & Engineering Chemistry Fundamentals and Industrial & Engineering Chemistry Process Design and Development, both also established in 1962, were combined into Industrial & Engineering Chemistry Research.

Abstracting and indexing 
The journal is abstracted and indexed in:

According to the Journal Citation Reports, the journal achieved its highest impact factor to date (since 1997) of 3.720 in 2020, placing it in the Q2 JIF quartile of the "Engineering, Chemical" category. I&ECR has been in the Q1 quartile of this category in years 1997-2008, 2010-2012, 2014, and 2017-2018.

References

External links 
 

American Chemical Society academic journals
Biweekly journals
English-language journals
Publications established in 1909
Chemical engineering journals